Edward Bolesław Osóbka-Morawski  (5 October 1909 – 9 January 1997) was a Polish activist and politician in the Polish Socialist Party (PPS) before World War II, and after the Soviet takeover of Poland, Chairman of the Communist-dominated interim government, the Polish Committee of National Liberation (Polski Komitet Wyzwolenia Narodowego) formed in Lublin with Stalin's approval.

In October 1944, Osóbka-Morawski was given the role of Minister of Foreign Affairs and Agriculture. Several months later, in June 1945, he was appointed Prime Minister of the Provisional Government of National Unity (Tymczasowy Rząd Jedności Narodowej), in office until February 1947. Osóbka-Morawski believed the PPS should join with the other non-communist party in Poland, the Polish Peasant Party, to form a united front against the Communist Polish Workers' Party.  However, another prominent socialist, Józef Cyrankiewicz argued that the PPS should support the communists while opposing the creation of a one-party state. The Communists, with Soviet support, played on this division and forced Osóbka-Morawski to resign in favour of Cyrankiewicz.

Osóbka-Morawski would make his peace with the Communists, and gradually became a Stalinist. Nonetheless, in 1949 he was dismissed from his new post as the Minister of Public Administration, for "deviationist" tendencies. He was readmitted to the Communist Party, now called the Polish United Workers' Party, during the Polish October revolution of 1956. He then worked as a party official throughout most of his life in the People's Republic of Poland prior to the Revolutions of 1989, and in 1990 failed in his attempt to recreate the old Polish Socialist Party. He died in Warsaw in 1997.

See also
 Stalinism in Poland
 Socialist realism in Poland

Notes and references

1909 births
1997 deaths
People from Skarżysko County
People from Radom Governorate
Polish Socialist Party politicians
Polish United Workers' Party members
Prime Ministers of Poland
Ministers of Foreign Affairs of Poland
Members of the State National Council
Members of the Polish Sejm 1947–1952
Diplomats of the Polish People's Republic
Grand Crosses of the Order of Polonia Restituta
Recipients of the Order of the Cross of Grunwald, 3rd class
Burials at Powązki Military Cemetery